Club Santos Laguna Femenil is a Mexican women's football club based in Torreón, Coahuila, Mexico. The club has been the female section of Santos Laguna since 2017. The team plays in the Liga MX Femenil, which started in September 2017.

In April 2021, Santos Laguna forward Linda Frías became the first foreign-born Liga MX Femenil player to feature for a foreign national team.

Personnel

Coaching staff

Players

Current squad
As of 16 July 2021

References

 
Football clubs in Coahuila
Liga MX Femenil teams
Association football clubs established in 2017
Torreón
Women's association football clubs in Mexico
2017 establishments in Mexico